Kumar Varun is an Indian stand-up comedian, actor, writer and quizmaster. He is known for his roles in the comedy sketches of All India Bakchod, as the co-founder of the comedy collective Random Chikibum, along with stand-up comedian Rahul Subramanian, which won the OML Comedy Hunt. He has also featured alongside popular comedian Zakir Khan in both the seasons of the comedy webseries Amazon Prime Video's Chacha Vidhayak Hain Hamare.

Personal Life 
Born in 1985, Kumar spent most of his childhood growing up in Jamshedpur, Bokaro, Deoghar and Arrah. At the age of twelve he moved to Delhi and did his schooling from Sarla Chopra DAV Centenary Public School, Noida. He completed his engineering in biotechnology from Shanmugha Arts, Science, Technology & Research Academy, Tanjore in 2008. Varun married Maanvi Gagroo on 23 February 2023 in a private ceremony.

Career 

Before taking up stand up full time in 2017, Kumar worked as an engineer at TCS in Delhi from 2008-2011. Following which he did his MBA in Marketing at FMS, Delhi from 2011-2013. He worked as a brand manager in Mahindra Group and DBS Bank. It is during this time he met Rahul Subramanian, with whom he would go on to find the comedy collective Random Chikibum and win the OML Comedy Hunt judged by AIB and hosted by Biswa Kalyan Rath in 2016.

Varun in 2016, also wrote and acted in the 7-episode mini series Random Daftar along with Rahul Subramanian which has over 5 million views on YouTube. The same year he appeared as Atul Naak in four episodes of Sumukhi Suresh's sketch series Behti Naak.

In 2017 he rose to popularity with his role as Failure Mehta in All India Bakchod's three part sketch series Honest Campus Placements. He also played the role of Professor Kodoth in Amazon Prime Video's Laakhon Main Ek. 

Between 2017-2020 Kumar did various roles across web series and shorts including Anirban in Better Life Foundation, Kranti in both seasons of Amazon Prime Video's Chacha Vidhayak Hain Hamare, Babloo in DisneyPlus Hotstar's PariWar and the titular Buddhaditya Das in Mr. Das. In 2019 he also released his first stand up video on YouTube which has garnered more than 5.5 million views.

In 2022 Kumar Varun alongside the likes of Tanmay Bhat, Richa Chadda, Gopal Datt, Vijay Varma in two seasons of Farzi Mushaira, created by Zakir Khan for Amazon MiniTV. He also featured in an ad by ManMatters as part of their #LetsTalkMan campaign which created quite a buzz.

Kvizzing With The Comedians 
During the COVID-19 pandemic, Kumar Varun started hosting online quizzing tournaments with fellow comedians and other actors and writers under the title of Kvizzing With The Comedians. Since July 2020, 11 such tournaments have been conducted by Varun which have gained over 100 million views on YouTube.

Filmography

References

External links 

 
 
 

Living people
1985 births